The 2013–14 Ukrainian Second League is the 23rd season of 3rd level professional football in Ukraine. The competition was consolidated from two groups to one round robin competition. The list of teams was approved by Central Committee of the Professional Football League of Ukraine on 20 June 2013. Final decision was adapted by the PFL Conference on 26 June 2013. The competition began on 14 July 2013 and had a break winter from 30 November 2013. The competition resumed on 29 March 2014.

Team changes

Admitted teams
The following teams were admitted by the PFL after playing in the 2013 Ukrainian Football Amateur League and passing attestation.

FC Enerhiya Mykolaiv – initial group stage (debut)
FC Obolon-Brovar Kyiv – initial group stage (returning after an absence of 13 seasons)

Relegated teams
FC Arsenal Bila Tserkva – (returning after an absence of four seasons)

Withdrawn teams
FC Odesa were originally relegated from the Ukrainian First League but withdrew from the PFL prior to the start of the season
FC Sevastopol-2 were withdrawn by the main club and will participate in the 2013–14 Ukrainian Premier League Reserves and Under 19 competition

Expelled teams 
FC Zhemchuzhyna Yalta was refused attestation and expelled

Name changes 
 FC Arsenal Bila Tserkva was renamed to FC Arsenal-Kyivshchyna Bila Tserkva.
Prior to the start of the season FC Poltava-2 Karlivka severed its ties with FC Poltava as their Reserve team and reregistered with the PFL as FC Karlivka staying in Karlivka.
During the last season Real Pharm had moved to Ovidiopol. Prior to the start of the season the club had registered its name as Real Pharma Ovidiopol.

Location map 

The following displays the location of teams.

League table

Withdrawn teams

Dynamo Khmelnytskyi 
On 14 November the Football Club Dynamo Khmelnytskyi informed the PFL informed that the club would not travel to their Round 22 match against Shakhtar-3 Donetsk, indicating that the club would be withdrawing from the professional ranks. Control Disciplinary Committee of the Football Federation of Ukraine confirmed the withdrawal after the team had not fulfilled playing two games during the season. All of their matches after Round 21 are considered technical losses. The club played twenty matches in the League and had a record of 3 wins, 2 draws and 15 losses (including a technical loss) with 18 goals scored and 49 allowed. (21 November 2013)

Enerhiya Mykolaiv 
On 6 March the administration of Enerhiya Mykolaiv informed that the club would not be funded by MykolaivOblEnerho hence leaving the club defunct. All of their matches after Round 23 are considered technical losses. The club played twenty two matches in the League and had a record of 9 wins, 3 draws and 15 losses (including a technical loss) with 24 goals scored and 28 allowed.  (6 March 2014)

Myr Hornostayivka 
On 14 February the administration of Myr Hornostayivka informed that the club would not continue competing in the Second League. The president of the club informed the players that they are free agents. The club was officially withdrawn from the PFL later in March before the start of the spring session of the competition. All of their matches after Round 23 are considered technical losses. The club played twenty three matches in the League and had a record of 11 wins, 4 draws and 8 losses with 32 goals scored and 27 allowed.  (24 March 2014)

Shakhtar Sverdlovsk 
In summer of 2014 participation of the club in the Professional League competitions was suspended due to the Russian invasion of Ukraine. In summer of 2015 the club was officially withdrawn from the league.

Results

Round by round
The following table represents the teams position after each round in the competition.

Top goalscorers

See also
 2013–14 Ukrainian Premier League
 2013–14 Ukrainian First League
 2013–14 Ukrainian Cup

References

Ukrainian Second League seasons
3
Uk